"Again" is a song by American singer Faith Evans. It was written by Ivan Barias, Carvin Haggins, and Evans for her fourth studio album The First Lady (2005), while production was helmed by Barias and Haggins under their production moniker Carvin & Ivan. It contains a sample from "Genuine" by American 1970s soul group the Whatnauts. Due to the inclusion of the sample, Jerry Harris and Venus Dodson are also credited as songwriters. A midtempo R&B song with heavy neo soul and Motown influences, it discusses Evans's 2004 arrest for drug possession.

Released as the lead single from The First Lady on February 7, 2005, the song marked a top-10 return for Evans on the US Billboard Hot R&B/Hip-Hop Songs chart, peaking at number seven. "Again" also peaked at number 47 on the US Billboard Hot 100. Worldwide, the song charted within the top 50 in Austrasia and peaked at number 12 on the UK Singles Chart. The accompanying music video for "Again" was directed by longtime collaborator Chris Robinson and filmed in Los Angeles, California in late January 2005.

Background and recording
"Again" was written by Evans with Venus Dodson, Jerry Harris, and Ivan Barias and Carvin Haggins, while the latter handled the song's entire production. The track is one out of several track on which Evans collaborated with Carvin & Ivan, both of whom advised her to record a song for the album that would address her 2004 arrest for drug possession. In an interview with Vibe, Haggins noted, that the original lyrics to "Again" were actually more risqué than the version that was eventually recorded for the album. In the first version of the song's second verse Evans name-checked radio personality Wendy Williams and cited old rumors about a romance with Tupac Shakur. Evans called "Again" a "testament to my name" and added: "This song is near and dear to my heart. I'm not perfect, and everything I’ve been through has been for a reason. My faith in God and knowing that he watches over me helps me to believe that if he brought me to it, he'll bring me through it."

Music video
The accompanying music video for "Again" was directed by longtime collaborator Chris Robinson and filmed in Los Angeles, California in late January 2005. Production was overseen by Dawn Rose for Robot Films/HSI, while Jeff Selis served as the video's editor. It debuted in March 2005.

Track listings

Credits and personnel
Credits are adapted from the liner notes of The First Lady.

 Ivan Barias – producer, writer
 Venus Dodson – writer
 Faith Evans – vocals, writer
 Carvin Haggins – producer, writer

 Jerry Harris – writer
 Manny Marroquin – mixing
 Brad Todd – recording

Charts

Weekly charts

Year-end charts

Release history

References

Faith Evans songs
2004 songs
2005 singles
Capitol Records singles
EMI Records singles
Music videos directed by Chris Robinson (director)
Neo soul songs
Song recordings produced by Carvin & Ivan
Songs written by Carvin Haggins
Songs written by Faith Evans
Songs written by Ivan Barias